Iman Abuzeid is a Sudanese-American physician and entrepreneur. She is the co-founder and CEO of Incredible Health, a digital nurse hiring platform.

Early life and education 
Abuzeid was born to Sudanese parents in Saudi Arabia, where her father, an otolaryngologist surgeon, was working. Abuzeid gained undergraduate and medical degrees from University College London, then moved to the United States to work in healthcare consulting.

She is a McKinsey alumnus and attended the Wharton School where she earned an MBA.

Career 
Abuzeid is the co-founder and CEO of Incredible Health, a digital nurse hiring platform.

References 

Year of birth missing (living people)
Living people
Place of birth missing (living people)
American people of Sudanese descent
Wharton School of the University of Pennsylvania alumni
African-American women physicians
American women chief executives
American health care chief executives
McKinsey & Company people

Alumni of University College London
21st-century American women physicians
21st-century American physicians
Women founders